Stanny Simon is a cricketer from Antigua and Barbuda. He made his first-class debut for the Leeward Islands in the 2017–18 Regional Four Day Competition on 9 November 2017.

References

External links
 

Year of birth missing (living people)
Living people
Antigua and Barbuda cricketers
Leeward Islands cricketers
Place of birth missing (living people)